The Catholic Church venerates five patron saints of Poland. The primary patron saints are the Blessed Virgin Mary the Queen of Poland, Saint Adalbert, and Saint Stanislaus of Szczepanów. The secondary patron saints are the Jesuits Saint Stanislaus Kostka and Saint Andrew Bobola. Historically, several other saints also were considered patrons of Poland.

Primary 
The Most Holy Virgin Mary, Queen of Poland (Najświętsza Maryja Panna, Królowa Polski)
Bogurodzica ("Mother of God"), dating back to the 13th century, plays the role of Poland's first national anthem
 In the 14th century, Grzegorz of Sambor names the BVM "the queen of Poland and the Poles"
 1 April 1655, King John Casimir proclaims the BVM the patroness saint of his realm (see: Lwów Oath)
 8 September 1717, coronation of the icon of Our Lady of Częstochowa with papal crowns
 1920, Pope Benedict XV declares 3 May a solemnity of the BVM the Queen of Poland
 1962, Pope John XXIII declares the BVM the Queen of Poland a principal patroness saint of Poland
 Saint Adalbert (święty Wojciech; c. 956–997)
 Saint Stanislaus of Szczepanów (święty Stanisław Szczepanowski; 1030–1079)

Secondary 
 Saint Stanislaus Kostka (święty Stanisław Kostka; 1550–1568)
 Saint Andrew Bobola (święty Andrzej Bobola; 1591–1657)

Historical 

 Saint Florian (święty Florian; died c. 304)
 Saint Wenceslaus (święty Wacław; c. 907–953)
 Saint Hedwig of Silesia (święta Jadwiga Śląska; 1174–1243)
 Saint Hyacinth (święty Jacek; c. 1200–1257)
 Blessed Bronislava (błogosławiona Bronisława; c. 1200–1259)
 Saint Kinga (święta Kinga; 1224–1292)
 Saint Jadwiga the Queen (święta Jadwiga Królowa; c. 1373/4–1399)
 Saint John Cantius (święty Jan Kanty; 1390–1473)
 Servant of God Isaiah Boner (sługa Boży Izajasz Boner; c. 1400–1471)
 Saint John of Dukla (święty Jan z Dukli; 1414–1484)
 Blessed Ladislaus of Gielniów (błogosławiony Władysław z Gielniowa; c. 1440–1505)
 Saint Casimir (święty Kazimierz; 1458–1484)
 Saint Josaphat Kuntsevych (święty Jozafat Kuncewicz; c. 1580–1623), Uniate

See also 
List of saints of Poland

References

Notes

Sources 
 
 

 
Polish Roman Catholic saints
Poland
Saints
Saints